Frontenac station is a Montreal Metro station in the borough of Ville-Marie in Montreal, Quebec, Canada. It is operated by the Société de transport de Montréal (STM) and serves the Green Line. It is located at 2570 Ontario Street East in the Sainte-Marie neighbourhood, part of the Centre-Sud.

Overview 
Although part of the original network of the Metro, it opened two months after the rest of the system, on December 19, 1966. It served as the eastern terminus of the Green Line until the extension to Honoré-Beaugrand was completed in 1976. It is also the only station on the original Green Line not located under De Maisonneuve Boulevard.

Designed by Robillard, Jetté et Beaudoin, it is a normal side platform station built in tunnel. A transept provides access via several long escalators to the entrance, which was recently rebuilt according to a design by Christian Bisson.

Renovations occurred in November–December 2005, when the station was closed during weekends.

Origin of the name
Frontenac station takes its name from nearby Rue Frontenac, which in turn is named for Louis de Buade, sieur de Frontenac et de Palluau. The godson of King Louis XIII of France, he was governor-general of New France between 1672 and his death in 1698. Frontenac is famous for repelling the attack of Sir William Phips,  saying, "I will not respond to your general but through the mouths of my cannons and with gunfire."

Connecting bus routes

Nearby points of interest
 Place Frontenac
 Maison de la culture et bibliothèque Frontenac
 Éco-quartier de Sainte-Marie
 Parc Médéric-Martin
 Centre Jean-Claude Malépart
 Bain Mathieu - Société pour promouvoir les arts gigantesques (SPAG)
 Maison Norman Bethune

References

External links
 Frontenac Station  - official site
 Montreal by Metro, metrodemontreal.com - photos, information, and trivia
 Metro Map

Green Line (Montreal Metro)
Railway stations in Canada opened in 1966
Centre-Sud
1966 establishments in Quebec